Grigory Bremel (born 10 April 1968) is a Russian modern pentathlete. He competed in the men's individual event at the 1996 Summer Olympics.

References

1968 births
Living people
Russian male modern pentathletes
Olympic modern pentathletes of Russia
Modern pentathletes at the 1996 Summer Olympics
Place of birth missing (living people)